The de Vic Baronetcy, of Guernsey, was a title in the Baronetage of England. It was created on 3 September 1649 for Henry de Vic, Chancellor of the Order of the Garter. The title became extinct on the death of the second Baronet in 1688.

de Vic baronets, of Guernsey (1649)
Sir Henry de Vic, 1st Baronet (–1671)
Sir Charles de Vic, 2nd Baronet (died 1688)

References

Extinct baronetcies in the Baronetage of England
1649 establishments in England